Cymindis picta is a species of ground beetle in the subfamily Harpalinae. It was described by Pallas in 1771.

References

picta
Beetles described in 1771
Taxa named by Peter Simon Pallas